The 1989 Currie Cup Division A (known as the Santam Bank Currie Cup for sponsorship reasons) was the top division of the Currie Cup competition, the premier domestic rugby union competition in South Africa. This was the 51st season since the competition started in 1889.

Teams

Changes between 1988 and 1989 seasons
 Division A was expanded from seven to eight teams.
  were promoted from Division B.

Changes between 1989 and 1990 seasons
  withdrew.
  were promoted from Division B.

Competition

Regular season and title play-offs
There were eight participating teams in the 1989 Currie Cup Division A. These teams played each other twice over the course of the season, once at home and once away. Teams received two points for a win and one points for a draw. The top two teams qualified for the title play-offs (along with the top team from Division B). In the semi-finals, the team that finished second had home advantage against the team that finished top of Division B, while the team that finished top had a bye through to the final. The final was then played at the home venue of the higher-placed team.

Relegation play-offs
The bottom team on the log qualified for the relegation play-offs. That team played off against the team placed top in Division B over two legs. The winner over these two ties qualified for the 1990 Currie Cup Division A, while the losing team qualified for the 1990 Currie Cup Division B.

Log

Fixtures and results

Round one

Round two

Round three

Round four

Round five

Round six

Round seven

Round eight

Round nine

Round ten

Round eleven

Round twelve

Round thirteen

Round fourteen

Round fifteen

Semi-finals

Final

Relegation play-offs

At the end of September 1989, the South African Rugby Board announced that  would not play in the 1990 Currie Cup competition and that  would be automatically promoted. Despite suggestions that  would be allowed back into the Currie Cup, South West Africa later voluntarily withdrew, due to uncertainty arising from Namibia gaining independence.

See also
 1989 Currie Cup Division B
 1989 Santam Bank Trophy Division A
 1989 Santam Bank Trophy Division B
 1989 Lion Cup

References

A
1989